Kurunthancode is a block or Panchayat Union of Kanyakumari district, India. It is one of the nine administrative divisions of the district of Kanyakumari. The present President of the Kurunthancode Panchayat is P. Lawrence. It includes the following Village Panchayats,

 Kakkottuthalai
 Kattimancode
 Kuruthencode
 Muttom
 Nettancode
 Simoncolony
 Thalakulam
 Tenkarai
 Vellichandai

References
 Official Web Portal of Kanyakumari District

Cities and towns in Kanyakumari district